Abundius of Pietra Montecorvina is a martyr and saint.

His relics are kept at Pietramontecorvino, near Lucera in the province of Foggia in southern Italy. His feast day is kept there on February 27.

References

Sources
Holweck, F. G. A Biographical Dictionary of the Saints. St. Louis, MO: B. Herder Book Co. 1924.

External links
Saints.SQPN: Abundius of Rome

Christian saints in unknown century
Italian saints
Christian martyrs
Year of birth missing
Year of death missing